Marion is a city in, and the county seat of, Marion County, Kansas, United States.  It was named in honor of Francis Marion, a brigadier general of the American Revolutionary War, known as the "Swamp Fox".  As of the 2020 census, the population of the city was 1,922.

History

Early history

For many millennia, the Great Plains of North America was inhabited by nomadic Native Americans.  From the 16th century to 18th century, the Kingdom of France claimed ownership of large parts of North America.  In 1762, after the French and Indian War, France secretly ceded New France to Spain, per the Treaty of Fontainebleau.

19th century

In 1802, Spain returned most of the land to France.  In 1803, most of the land for modern day Kansas was acquired by the United States from France as part of the 828,000 square mile Louisiana Purchase for 2.83 cents per acre.

In 1806, Zebulon Pike led the Pike Expedition westward from St Louis, Missouri, of which part of their journey followed the Cottonwood River through Marion County near the current cities of Florence, Marion, Durham.

In 1854, the Kansas Territory was organized, then in 1861 Kansas became the 34th U.S. state.  In 1855, Marion County was established within the Kansas Territory, which included the land for modern day Marion.

The city of Marion Centre was founded in 1860 and became the county seat, named in honor of Francis Marion.  A post office was established on September 30, 1862, which shortened the name to Marion on October 15, 1881. The city officially adopted the shorter name on January 17, 1882.  In 1875, Marion incorporated as a city as a 3rd class city, later in 1888 it became a 2nd class city.

As early as 1875, city leaders of Marion held a meeting to consider a branch railroad from Florence. In 1878, Atchison, Topeka and Santa Fe Railway and parties from Marion County and McPherson County chartered the Marion and McPherson Railway Company.  In 1879, a branch line was built from Florence to McPherson, in 1880 it was extended to Lyons, in 1881 it was extended to Ellinwood. The line was leased and operated by the Atchison, Topeka and Santa Fe Railway. The line from Florence to Marion, was abandoned in 1968. In 1992, the line from Marion to McPherson was sold to Central Kansas Railway. In 1993, after heavy flood damage, the line from Marion to McPherson was abandoned. The original branch line connected Florence, Marion, Canada, Hillsboro, Lehigh, Canton, Galva, McPherson, Conway, Windom, Little River, Mitchell, Lyons, Chase, Ellinwood. Later, the Santa Fe depot building was converted into the Marion Library. Most locals still refer to this railroad as the "Santa Fe".

In 1887, the Chicago, Kansas and Nebraska Railway built a branch line north-south from Herington through Marion to Caldwell. It foreclosed in 1891 and was taken over by Chicago, Rock Island and Pacific Railway, which shut down in 1980 and reorganized as Oklahoma, Kansas and Texas Railroad, merged in 1988 with Missouri Pacific Railroad, and finally merged in 1997 with Union Pacific Railroad. Most locals still refer to this railroad as the "Rock Island".

In 1889, the Marion Belt and Chingawasa Springs Railroad built a  railroad from Marion north-east to Chingawasa Springs. A hotel was built near the site of the spa at Chingawasa Springs, and a depot and eatery as well. Both Santa Fe and Rock Island offered round trip fares from Chicago and western cities to Chingawasa Springs. An economic panic in 1893 closed down the health spa and hotel, and quarry business along the tracks never developed sufficiently. In 1893, the railroad ceased operations, and tracks were removed in 1910.

20th century

The National Old Trails Road, also known as the Ocean-to-Ocean Highway, was established in 1912, and was routed through Lehigh, Hillsboro, Marion and Lost Springs.

In 1937, the Marion County Lake was completed by the Civilian Conservation Corps south-east of Marion for the purpose of recreation. There were numerous floods during the early history of Marion. In June and July 1951, due to heavy rains, rivers and streams flooded numerous cities in Kansas, including Marion. Many reservoirs and levees were built in Kansas as part of a response to the Great Flood of 1951. From 1964 to 1968, the Marion Reservoir was constructed north-west of Marion. Downstream from the Marion Reservoir, levees were built in the low areas of Marion and Florence.

Geography

Marion is located at coordinates 38.3483493, -97.0172450 in the scenic Flint Hills and Great Plains of the state of Kansas.

Climate
The climate in this area is characterized by hot, humid summers and generally mild to cool winters.  According to the Köppen Climate Classification system, Marion has a humid subtropical climate, abbreviated "Cfa" on climate maps.

Area events
 Chingawassa Days Festival
 Old Settler's Day
 Art in the Park and Craft Show

Area attractions

Marion has five listings on the National Register of Historic Places (NRHP).
 Elgin Hotel (NRHP), 115 North 3rd Street. Currently a Bed and Breakfast.
 First Presbyterian Church (NRHP), 610 East Lawrence Street.
 Hill Grade School (NRHP), 601 East Main Street.
 Marion County Courthouse (NRHP), 200 South 3rd Street.
 Marion County Museum, 623 East Main Street. Formerly the First Baptist Church from 1882 to mid-1950s.
 Marion Reservoir, exits closest to farther from Marion along US-56: Marion cove and Cottonwood Point cove (Pawnee Road), Overlook and Dam (Old Mill Road), Hillsboro cove (Nighthawk Road), French Creek cove (Limestone Road).

Demographics

2010 census
At the 2010 census, there were 1,927 people, 846 households, and 514 families residing in the city. The racial makeup of the city was 97.6% White, 0.6% African American, 0.3% Native American, 0.1% Asian, 0.1% Pacific Islander, 0.5% from other races, and 0.8% from two or more races. Hispanic or Latino of any race were 1.4% of the population.

There were 846 households, of which 28.6% had children under the age of 18 living with them, 47.3% were married couples living together, 9.6% had a female householder with no husband present, 3.9% had a male householder with no wife present, and 39.2% were non-families. 36.2% of all households were made up of individuals, and 19.5% had someone living alone who was 65 years of age or older. The average household size was 2.23 and the average family size was 2.90.

The median age was 44 years. 24.3% of residents were under the age of 18; 6.6% were between the ages of 18 and 24; 20.5% were from 25 to 44; 25.6% were from 45 to 64; and 23% were 65 years of age or older. The gender makeup was 47.5% male and 52.5% female.

2000 census
At the 2000 census, there were 2,110 people, 859 households and 556 families residing in the city. The racial makeup of the city was 97.58% White, 0.05% African American, 0.81% Native American, 0.09% Asian, 0.24% from other races, and 1.23% from two or more races. Hispanic or Latino of any race were 1.37% of the population.

There were 859 households, of which 29.7% had children under the age of 18 living with them, 55.8% were married couples living together, 5.8% had a female householder with no husband present, and 35.2% were non-families. 31.9% of all households were made up of individuals, and 20.8% had someone living alone who was 65 years of age or older. The average household size was 2.34 and the average family size was 2.94.

25.5% of the population were under the age of 18, 5.5% from 18 to 24, 22.8% from 25 to 44, 19.6% from 45 to 64, and 26.6% who were 65 years of age or older. The median age was 42 years. For every 100 females, there were 86.4 males. For every 100 females age 18 and over, there were 83.0 males.

The median household income was $32,125 and the median family income was $42,202. Males had a median income of $30,907 compared with $23,929 for females. The per capita income for the city was $16,464. About 5.3% of families and 6.7% of the population were below the poverty line, including 8.5% of those under age 18 and 7.5% of those age 65 or over.

Government

City
The Marion government consists of a mayor and four council members. The city council meets every other Monday at 4:30pm.
 City Hall, 203 N 3rd St.
 Police and Fire Department, 112 N 5th St.

County
 Marion County Courthouse, 203 S 4th St.

U.S.
 U.S. Post Office, 423 E Main St.
 U.S. Consolidated Farm Service Agency, 301 Eisenhower Dr.

Education

Primary and secondary education
The community is served by Marion–Florence USD 408 public school district.  The high school is a member of T.E.E.N., a shared video teaching network between five area high schools.
 Marion High School (Kansas), 701 E Main St.
 Marion Middle School, 125 S Lincoln St.
 Marion Elementary School, 1400 E Lawrence St.

Library
Each USD 408 school has a library for student access. The city is served by the Marion City Library at 101 Library Street. The library is a member of the North Central Kansas Libraries System, which provides an inter-library book loan service between its members.

Media

Print
 Marion County Record, official newspaper for City of Marion and Marion County.
 Hillsboro Free Press, free newspaper for greater Marion County area.

Radio
Marion is served by numerous radio stations from the Wichita-Hutchinson listening market area, and satellite radio. (See Media in Wichita, Kansas.)

Television
Marion is served by over-the-air ATSC digital TV of the Wichita-Hutchinson viewing market area, cable TV, and satellite TV.  (See Media in Wichita, Kansas.)

Infrastructure

Transportation
Kansas Highway 256 runs through the center of town as Main Street, past the east end business section, Marion High School and the downtown business district. A regional Kansas Department of Transportation office is located on the north side of Marion at the corner of U.S. Route 56 and Cedar Street.

The Oklahoma Kansas Texas (OKT) line of the Union Pacific Railroad runs north-south through the city.

Notable people

 Randolph Carpenter (1894–1956), U.S. Representative from Kansas and a U.S. Army World War I veteran.
 Charlie Faust (1880–1915), Major League baseball player
 Beverly Hoch (born 1951), soprano
 Edward Hoch (1849–1925), Kansas House of Representatives, 17th Governor of Kansas, editor of Marion County Record, Hoch Auditoria at University of Kansas was named after him.
 Homer Hoch (1879–1949), U.S. Congressman, member of Kansas Supreme Court, lawyer, editor of Marion County Record
 Tex Jones (1885–1938), Major League baseball player
 Eric Meyer (born 1953), journalism professor at University of Illinois, Pulitzer Prize nominee, president and majority owner of Hoch Publishing Co (in Marion)
 Fay Moulton (1876–1945), Olympic sprinter, football player and coach, lawyer; served as fifth head football coach at Kansas State Agricultural College, now Kansas State University
 Samuel Peters (1842–1910), Captain in Union Army (1861–1865), Kansas State Senate (1874–1875), Judge of 9th District (1875–1883), U.S. House of Representatives (1883–1891), editor of * William Runyan (1870–1957), preacher, songwriter who composed "Great Is Thy Faithfulness"
 Carla Stovall (born 1957), Kansas Attorney General

See also
 Cottonwood River and Great Flood of 1951
 Historical Maps of Marion County, Kansas
 National Old Trails Road
 National Register of Historic Places listings in Marion County, Kansas

References

Further reading

 Marion County Dreamed of Prosperity in Chingawassa Springs, Quarry Siding and Rainbow Lake; Marion Record Review; September 14, 1944.
 Memories of Old Chingawassa Railroad and Resort; Marion Record; September 10/11 Souvenir Edition, 1941.
 First Mayor of Marion Centre; Jack Costello; Marion Record; September 10/11 Souvenir Edition, 1941.
 Presbyterian Church Seventy Years Old; Marion Record; September 11, 1941.
 Marion, Kansas; Printing Bureau, 1926.

External links

 
 Marion - Directory of Public Officials, League of Kansas Municipalities
 Historic Images of Marion, Special Photo Collections at Wichita State University Library
 Marion city map, KDOT

Cities in Kansas
County seats in Kansas
Cities in Marion County, Kansas
Populated places established in 1860
1860 establishments in Kansas Territory